Heretic  is  the third studio album by the band Naked City, used as a soundtrack for the underground S/M film Jeux des Dames Cruelles. The album utilises different combinations of band members in duos and trios with the entire band performing together on only one track "Fire and Ice".

According to the Knitting Factory, "Heretic is an experimental narrative in the form of an extended trailer. A very funny take on psychotherapy starring Karen Finley."

Reception
The Allmusic review by Caleb Deupree awarded the album 4½ stars stating  "Although this album is credited as a soundtrack for a porn movie (scenes from which decorate the sleeve art), its music will appeal to many improv-oriented listeners who have a hard time with the thrash/hardcore atmosphere that is so characteristic of the band's first album and the Torture Garden pieces."

Track listing
All music by Naked City

Main Titles (Eye, Horvitz, Baron) – 1:26
Sex Games (Frisell, Frith, Baron) – 2:21
The Brood (Zorn, Horvitz, Baron) – 2:48
Sweat, Sperm + Blood (Eye, Zorn) – 2:03
Vliet (Frisell, Frith) – 0:49
Heretic 1 (Zorn, Frith) – 2:32
Submission (Horvitz, Frisell, Baron) – 4:21
Heretic 2 (Zorn, Frith, Baron) – 1:44
Catacombs (Horvitz, Frisell) – 2:46
Heretic 3 (Zorn, Frith, Baron) – 2:41
My Master, My Slave (Horvitz, Frith) – 2:23
Saint Jude (Frisell, Frith, Baron) – 2:12
The Conqueror Worm (Zorn, Horvitz) – 2:31
Dominatrix 5B (Horvitz, Frisell, Baron) – 2:16
Back Through the Looking Glass (Frisell, Frith) – 2:39
Here Come the 7,000 Frogs (Eye, Zorn) – 1:59
Slaughterhouse/Chase Sequence (Frisell, Frith, Baron) – 2:18
Castle Keep (Horvitz, Frisell) – 1:48
Mantra of Resurrected Shit (Eye, Zorn) – 1:41
Trypsicore (Horvitz, Baron) – 1:46
Fire and Ice (Club Scene) (Naked City) – 2:37
Crosstalk (Horvitz, Frisell, Frith) – 1:40
Copraphagist Rituals (Eye, Horvitz, Baron) – 0:53
Labyrinth (Frisell, Baron) – 5:47

Personnel
John Zorn – alto saxophone
Bill Frisell – guitar
Wayne Horvitz – keyboards
Fred Frith – bass
Joey Baron – drums
Yamatsuka Eye – vocals

References

1992 albums
Naked City (band) albums
Albums produced by John Zorn